Cohen Glacier is a small glacier draining northward from Mount Cohen of the Herbert Range to enter Strom Glacier near the head of Ross Ice Shelf. It was named by the Southern Party of the New Zealand Geological Survey Antarctic Expedition, 1963–64, in association with Mount Cohen.

References
 

Glaciers of Dufek Coast